Call Esteban (Spanish: Llama un tal Esteban) is a 1960 Spanish crime film directed by Pedro Luis Ramírez and starring Luz Márquez, José Campos and Malila Sandoval.

Cast
 Luz Márquez 
 José Campos as Juan  
 Malila Sandoval 
 José María Caffarel 
 Luis Induni as Esteban 
 Estanis González 
 Adrián Ortega 
 Alejo del Peral as Ascensorista  
 Leandro Vizcaíno
 Roberto Samsó 
 Jesús Redondo 
 Juanita Espín 
 Joaquín Ejerique 
 Pilar González 
 José L. Sansalvador 
 Salvador Muñoz 
 Manuel Bronchud as Botones  
 José Rivelles 
 Lina Cuffi 
 Amparo Baró 
 Víctor Prades 
 Carmen Expósito
 Isidro Novellas as Mecánico

References

Bibliography 
 Àngel Comas. Diccionari de llargmetratges: el cinema a Catalunya durant la Segona República, la Guerra Civil i el franquisme (1930-1975). Cossetània Edicions, 2005.

External links 
 

1960 crime films
Spanish crime films
1960 films
1960s Spanish-language films
Films directed by Pedro Luis Ramírez
1960s Spanish films